The Sorgues (also called Sorgue,) is a  river in the Aveyron department in Southern France. Its source is a karstic spring at Fontaine de Valcluse, in Provence. See also “Sorgue.”

Communes along its course
This list is ordered from source to mouth: Cornus, Fondamente, Marnhagues-et-Latour, Saint-Félix-de-Sorgues, Versols-et-Lapeyre, Saint-Affrique, Vabres-l'Abbaye

References

Rivers of France
Rivers of Occitania (administrative region)
Rivers of Aveyron